The Anthology of Black Humor (French: Anthologie de l'humour noir) is an anthology of 45 writers edited by André Breton. It was first published in 1940 in Paris by Éditions du Sagittaire and its distribution was immediately banned by the Vichy government. It was reprinted in 1947 after Breton's return from exile, with a few additions. In 1966, Breton, "having resisted the temptation to add more names", published the book again and called this edition "the definitive".

The anthology not only introduced some until then almost unknown or forgotten writers, it also coined the term "black humor" (as Breton said, until then the term had meant nothing, unless someone imagined jokes about black people ). The term became globally used since then. The choice of authors was done entirely by Breton and according to his taste which he explains in the Foreword (called The Lightning Rod, a term suggested by Lichtenberg), a work of great depth (Breton was the main theoretician of the Surrealist movement) that starts with contemplating Rimbaud´s words "Emanations, explosions." from Rimbaud's last poem The barrack-room of night : Dream. The authors, each introduced by a preface by Breton and represented by a few pages from their writings, are sorted chronologically. The book is still in print. It was translated into several languages; into English by Mark Polizzotti in 1997.

Contents of the 1966 "definitive" edition 
The anthology contains the following excerpts, each introduced by a commentary by Breton:
 Jonathan Swift: Directions to Servants, A Modest Proposal, Meditation Upon a Broomstick; a few aphorisms;
 D.-A.-F.de Sade: Juliette
 Georg Christoph Lichtenberg: selected aphorisms.
 Charles Fourier: L'éléphant, le chien...
 Thomas De Quincey: On Murder Considered as one of the Fine Arts
 Pierre François Lacenaire
 Petrus Borel: Marchand et voleur est synonyme
 Christian Dietrich Grabbe
 Edgar Allan Poe: The Angel of the Odd
 Xavier Forneret
 Charles Baudelaire
 Lewis Carroll: Lobster Quadrille
 Villiers de l'Isle-Adam: Le Tueur de cygnes (from Tribulat Bonhomet)
 Charles Cros
 Friedrich Nietzsche: Letter to Jacob Burckhardt (also published in The Portable Nietzsche)
 Isidore Ducasse (Comte de Lautréamont): excerpts from Maldor and Letters (Also published in Maldor and the Complete Works of the Comte de Lautreamont)
 Joris-Karl Huysmans
 Tristan Corbière: The Litany of Sleep (also published in the Centenary Corbiere)
 Germain Nouveau
 Arthur Rimbaud: excerpt from A Heart under a Cassok (also published in Completed Works, Selected Letters)
 Alphonse Allais
 Jean-Pierre Brisset
 O. Henry
 André Gide: Prometheus' Lecture (also published in Marshlands and Prometheus Misbound)
 John Millington Synge
 Alfred Jarry: The Debraining Song; and excerpts from Ubu Enchained, Act I, Scene II Le Champ de Mars (also published in The Ubu Plays)
 Raymond Roussel: excerpt from Impressions of Africa
 Francis Picabia
 Guillaume Apollinaire: Dramaturgy and Meetings (from The Poet Assassinated and Other Stories)
 Pablo Picasso
 Arthur Cravan
 Franz Kafka: excerpt from The Metamorphosis
 Jakob van Hoddis
 Marcel Duchamp: aphorisms (also found in The Writings of Marchel Duchamp
 Hans Arp: Bestiary with no First Name
 Alberto Savinio: Introduction to a Life of Mercury (from Le lives of the Gods)
 Jacques Vaché
 Benjamin Péret: Death to the Pigs and other writings
 Jacques Rigaut
 Jacques Prévert
 Salvador Dalí
 Jean Ferry
 Leonora Carrington: The Debutante
 Gisèle Prassinos
 Jean-Pierre Duprey

Others works excerpted include:
Louis Aragon's 1928 Treatise on Style. Freud's 1928 Humor from International Journal of Psychoanalysis 9 1-6 (republished in Collected papers of Sigmung Freud vol.5).

References

External links
 Info from City Lights, its English publisher

1940 anthologies
French anthologies
Books about humor
Surrealist works